Jacob Gould (February 10, 1794 – November 18, 1867) was the second overall and first Democratic mayor of Rochester, New York. Gould arrived in Rochester from Massachusetts as a school teacher and became one of the area's first shoemakers. He was a general in the New York State Militia. After his one-year term as mayor, Gould went on to work for Rochester banks, railroads, and at the University of Rochester as one of the school's first trustees.

He is also notable for having fought against the acquisition by the city of the land for Mount Hope Cemetery. Gould declared the hilly land was not "fit for pasturing rabbits." Despite this, he became one of the first people to buy a plot in the new cemetery.

References

External links
 

Mayors of Rochester, New York
1794 births
1867 deaths
19th-century American politicians